Spawn of Dysfunction is the first album by Die So Fluid. It was recorded at Criterion Studios, London, in November 2003 and released through the band's own label, Cartesian Records Ltd, in the United Kingdom in 2004. It was distributed by Cargo Records. The album was not released internationally until 2008. It was distributed by Renaissance Recordings in the USA and Universal Music Germany distributed it to several European countries. When originally purchased in the USA, a sticker on the front of the album said "The First Album from Die So Fluid Expanded U.S. Edition", although it has the same tracks.

Track listing
Music by Die So Fluid, Lyrics by Grog.

Personnel
Band
 Grog – vocals, bass
 Drew "Mr Drew" Richards – guitar
 Al Fletcher – drums
Production
 Mark Williams - producer
 Eric Broyhill - mastering
 Uncle Vania - illustrations
 Paul Harries - photography
 Hugh (Gilmour Design) - design

Singles
Suck Me Dry (2002)
 "Suck Me Dry" - 3:43
 "Twisting the Knife" - 4:19
 "Sound Will Save Me" - 4:48
 "Operation Hypocrite (Live) - 3:17

Disconnected (2002)
 "Disconnected" - 4:51
 "Beyond Help" - 4:28
 "Will Is Dead" - 4:43
 "Disconnected" (Video) - 4:51

Spawn of Dysfunction (2005)
 "Spawn of Dysfunction" - 4:17
 "Smear Campaign" - 3:37
 "Disconnected (Live)" - 4:29
 "Draw a Line and Cross It (Live) [Not Listed On Back]" - 4:05

Spawn of Dysfunction 10" vinyl (2005)
 "Spawn of Dysfunction" - 4:17
 "Smear Campaign" - 3:37
 "Shiva" - 3:40

References

2004 debut albums
Die So Fluid albums